Mefloquine, sold under the brand name Lariam among others, is a medication used to prevent or treat malaria. When used for prevention it is typically started before potential exposure and continued for several weeks after potential exposure. It can be used to treat mild or moderate malaria but is not recommended for severe malaria. It is taken by mouth.

Common side effects include vomiting, diarrhea, headaches, sleep disorders, and a rash. Serious side effects include potentially long-term mental health problems such as depression, hallucinations, and anxiety and neurological side effects such as poor balance, seizures, and ringing in the ears. It is therefore not recommended in people with a history of mental health problems or epilepsy. It appears to be safe during pregnancy and breastfeeding.

Mefloquine was developed by the United States Army in the 1970s and came into use in the mid-1980s. It is on the World Health Organization's List of Essential Medicines. It is available as a generic medication.

Medical uses

Mefloquine is used to both prevent and treat certain forms of malaria.

Malaria prevention
Mefloquine is useful for the prevention of malaria in all areas except for those where parasites may have resistance to multiple medications, and is one of several anti-malarial medications recommended by the United States Centers for Disease Control and Prevention for this purpose. It is also recommended by the Infectious Disease Society of America for malaria prophylaxis as a first or second-line agent, depending on resistance patterns in the malaria found in the geographic region visited. It is typically taken for one to two weeks before entering an area with malaria. Doxycycline and atovaquone/proguanil provide protection within one to two days and may be better tolerated. If a person becomes ill with malaria despite prophylaxis with mefloquine, the use of halofantrine and quinine for treatment may be ineffective.

Malaria treatment
Mefloquine is used as a treatment for chloroquine-sensitive or resistant Plasmodium falciparum malaria, and is deemed a reasonable alternative for uncomplicated chloroquine-resistant Plasmodium vivax malaria. It is one of several drugs recommended by the United States' Centers for Disease Control and Prevention.
It is not recommended for severe malaria infections, particularly infections from P. falciparum, which should be treated with intravenous antimalarials. Mefloquine does not eliminate parasites in the liver phase of the disease, and people with P. vivax malaria should be treated with a second drug that is effective for the liver phase, such as primaquine.

Resistance to mefloquine
Resistance to mefloquine is common around the west border in Cambodia and other parts of Southeast Asia. The mechanism of resistance is by increase in Pfmdr1 copy number.

Adverse effects
Common side effects include vomiting, diarrhea, headaches, and a rash. Severe side effects requiring hospitalization are rare, but include mental health problems such as depression, hallucinations, anxiety and neurological side effects such as poor balance, seizures, and ringing in the ears. Mefloquine is therefore not recommended in people with a history of psychiatric disorders or epilepsy.

Neurologic and psychiatric
In 2013, the U.S. Food and Drug Administration (FDA) added a boxed warning to the prescription label of mefloquine regarding the potential for neuropsychiatric side effects that may persist even after discontinuing administration of the medication. In 2013 the FDA stated "Neurologic side effects can occur at any time during drug use, and can last for months to years after the drug is stopped or can be permanent." Neurologic effects include dizziness, loss of balance, seizures, and tinnitus. Psychiatric effects include nightmares, visual hallucinations, auditory hallucinations, anxiety, depression, unusual behavior, and suicidal ideations.

Central nervous system events requiring hospitalization occur in about one in 10,000 people taking mefloquine for malaria prevention, with milder events (e.g., dizziness, headache, insomnia, and vivid dreams) in up to 25%. When some measure of subjective severity is applied to the rating of adverse events, about 11–17% of travelers are incapacitated to some degree.

Cardiac
Mefloquine may cause abnormalities with heart rhythms that are visible on electrocardiograms. Combining mefloquine with other drugs that cause similar effects, such as quinine or quinidine, can increase these effects. Combining mefloquine with halofantrine can cause significant increases in QTc intervals.

Contraindications
Mefloquine is contraindicated in those with a previous history of seizures or a recent history of psychiatric disorders.

Pregnancy and breastfeeding
Available data suggests that mefloquine is safe and effective for use by pregnant women during all trimesters of pregnancy, and it is widely used for this indication. In pregnant women, mefloquine appears to pose minimal risk to the fetus, and is not associated with increased risk of birth defects or miscarriages. Compared to other malaria chemoprophylaxis regimens, however, mefloqinone may produce more side effects in non-pregnant travelers.

Mefloquine is also safe and effective for use during breastfeeding, though it appears in breast milk in low concentrations. The World Health Organization (WHO) gives approval for the use of mefloquine in the second and third trimesters of pregnancy and use in the first trimester does not mandate termination of pregnancy.

Pharmacology

Elimination
Mefloquine is metabolized primarily through the liver. Its elimination in persons with impaired liver function may be prolonged, resulting in higher plasma levels and an increased risk of adverse reactions. The mean elimination plasma half-life of mefloquine is between two and four weeks. Total clearance is through the liver, and the primary means of excretion is through the bile and feces, as opposed to only 4% to 9% excreted through the urine. During long-term use, the plasma half-life remains unchanged.

Liver function tests should be performed during long-term administration of mefloquine. Alcohol use should be avoided during treatment with mefloquine.

Chemistry
Specifically it is used as mefloquine hydrochloride.

Mefloquine is a chiral molecule with two asymmetric carbon centres, which means it has four different stereoisomers. The drug is currently manufactured and sold as a racemate of the (R,S)- and (S,R)-enantiomers by Hoffman-LaRoche, a Swiss pharmaceutical company. Essentially, it is two drugs in one. Plasma concentrations of the (–)-enantiomer are significantly higher than those for the (+)-enantiomer, and the pharmacokinetics between the two enantiomers are significantly different. The (+)-enantiomer has a shorter half-life than the (–)-enantiomer.

History
Mefloquine was formulated at Walter Reed Army Institute of Research (WRAIR) in the 1970s shortly after the end of the Vietnam war. Mefloquine was number 142,490 of a total of 250,000 antimalarial compounds screened during the study.

Mefloquine was the first Public-Private Venture (PPV) between the US Department of Defense and a pharmaceutical company. WRAIR transferred all its phase I and phase II clinical trial data to Hoffman-LaRoche and Smith Kline. FDA approval as a treatment for malaria was swift. Most notably, phase III safety and tolerability trials were skipped.

The drug was first approved in Switzerland in 1984 by Hoffmann-LaRoche, who brought it to market with the name Lariam.

However, mefloquine was not approved by the FDA for prophylactic use until 1989. This approval was based primarily on compliance, while safety and tolerability were overlooked. Because of the drug's very long half-life, the Centers for Disease Control originally recommended a mefloquine dosage of 250 mg every two weeks; however, this caused an unacceptably high malaria rate in the Peace Corps volunteers who participated in the approval study, so the drug regimen was switched to once a week.

By 1991, Hoffman was marketing the drug on a worldwide basis.

By the 1992 UNITAF, Canadian soldiers were being prescribed the drug en masse.

By 1994, medical professionals were noting "severe psychiatric side effects observed during prophylaxis and treatment with mefloquine", and recommending that "the absence of contraindications and minor side effects during an initial course of mefloquine should be confirmed before another course is prescribed." Other doctors at the University Hospital of Zurich noted in a case of "a 47-year-old, previously healthy Japanese tourist" who had severe neuropsychiatric side-effects from the drug that

The first randomized, controlled trial on a mixed population was performed in 2001. Prophylaxis with mefloquine was compared to prophylaxis with atovaquone-proguanil. Roughly 67% of participants in the mefloquine arm reported greater than or equal to one adverse event, vs 71% in the atovaquone-proguanil arm. In the mefloquine arm, 5% of the users reported severe events requiring medical attention, vs 1.2% in the atovaquone-proguanil arm.

In August 2009, Roche stopped marketing Lariam in the United States.

Retired soldier Johnny Mercer, who was later appointed Minister for Veterans Affairs by Boris Johnson, told in 2015 that he had received "a letter about once or twice a week" about ill-effects from the drug. In July 2016, Roche took this brand off the market in Ireland.

Military

In 2006, the Australian military deemed mefloquine "a third-line drug" alternative, and over the five years from 2011 only 25 soldiers had been prescribed the drug, and only in cases of their intolerance for other alternatives. Between 2001 and 2012, 16,000 Canadian soldiers sent to Afghanistan were given the drug as a preventative measure. In 2013, the US Army banned mefloquine from use by its special forces such as the Green Berets. In autumn 2016, the UK military followed suit with their Australian peers after a parliamentary inquiry into the matter revealed that it can cause permanent side effects and brain damage.

In early December 2016, the German defence ministry removed mefloquine from the list of medications it would provide to its soldiers.

In autumn 2016, Canadian Surgeon General Brigadier General Hugh Colin MacKay told a parliamentary committee that faulty science supported the assertion that the drug has indelible noxious side effects. An expert from Health Canada named Barbara Raymond told the same committee that the evidence she had read failed to support the conclusion of indelible side effects. Canadian soldiers who took mefloquine when deployed overseas have claimed they have been left with ongoing mental health problems.

In 2020 the UK Ministry of Defence (MoD) admitted to a breach of duty regarding the use of Mefloquine. by acknowledging numerous instances of failure to assess the risks and warn of potential side effects of the drug.

Research
In June 2010, the first case report appeared of a progressive multifocal leukoencephalopathy being successfully treated with mefloquine. Mefloquine can also act against the JC virus. Administration of mefloquine seemed to eliminate the virus from the patient's body and prevented further neurological deterioration.

Mefloquine alters cholinergic synaptic transmission through both postsynaptic  and presynaptic actions. The postsynaptic action to inhibit acetylcholinesterase changes transmission across synapses in the brain.

References

Further reading

External links

 

American inventions
Antimalarial agents
Chirality
Chloroarenes
Drug safety
Hoffmann-La Roche brands
Medical controversies
Piperidines
Quinolines
Racemic mixtures
Trifluoromethyl compounds
World Health Organization essential medicines
Wikipedia medicine articles ready to translate